Ice fishing is the practice of catching fish with lines and fish hooks or spears through an opening in the ice on a frozen body of water. Ice fishers may fish in the open or in heated enclosures, some with bunks and amenities.

Shelters

Longer fishing expeditions can be mounted with simple structures. Larger, heated structures can make multiple day fishing trips possible. A structure with various local names, but often called an ice shanty, ice shack, fish house, shack, icehouse, bobhouse, or ice hut, is sometimes used. These are dragged or towed onto the lake using a vehicle such as a snowmobile, ATV or truck. The two most commonly used types are portable and permanent. The portable houses are often made of a heavy material that is usually watertight. The two most common types of portable houses are those with a shelter that flips behind the user when not needed, or pop up shelters with a door as the only way out. The permanent shelters are made of wood or metal and usually have wheels for easy transport. They can be as basic as a bunk heater and holes or have satellite television, bathrooms, stoves, full-size beds and may appear to be more like a mobile home than a fishing house.
 
In North America, ice fishing is often a social activity.  Some resorts have fish houses that are rented out by the day; often, shuttle service by Snow Track or other vehicles modified to drive on ice is provided. In North America, portable houses appear to create a city at locations where fishing is done.

Fishing equipment

Ice fishing gear is highly specialized. An ice saw, ice auger or chisel is used to cut a circular or rectangular hole in the ice.  The size of the hole depends on the type of fish sought,  generally suggested is 8 inches (20 cm). Power augers are sometimes used. If these tools are not available, an axe may be used to chop the hole. A skimmer, a large metal spoon with holes in it, is used to remove new ice as it forms and to clear slush left from making the hole. During colder periods most ice anglers choose to carry a heater of some type.  The heater is not only for warmth but also for keeping an angler's fishing hole from freezing.  When temperatures fall to -20 °F (-29 °C) or colder it becomes very hard to keep a fishing hole open.

Three main types of fishing occur. The first is using a small, light fishing rod with small, brightly coloured lures or jigs with bait such as wax worms, fat heads or crappie or shiner minnows. The angler sits at the hole in the ice and lifts the pole every now and then, producing the jig effect.

The second is using tip-ups, which are made of wood or plastic, and have a spool of line attached, with a thin piece of metal that goes from the spool to the flag. Black line is put on the spool and a swivel is placed at the end of the black line.  Then a piece of fishing line with a hook is attached to the swivel.  Worms, power bait, grub worms or small minnows are placed on the hook.  The hook with bait is placed into the water under the ice.  The depth that the bait is placed goes according to several theories.  One theory is the bait is placed one meter under the ice.  The second is that the bait is placed two to three metres under the ice.  The third is that the bait is suspended one foot (30 cm) above the bottom of the lake.   When the fish strikes the bait the flag is lifted which notifies the angler that a fish is on the hook.  The angler pulls the line in and the fish fights.  The angler will allow the line to slip through their hands during the struggle.  Finally, when the angler can get the fish's head into the hole in the ice, the fish is quickly lifted onto the ice.  This allows for less-intensive fishing.

The third method is spear fishing. A large hole is cut in the ice and fish decoys may be deployed. The angler sits in a dark ice shanty called a dark house.  The angler then peers into the water while holding a large spear which has four or five points.  A line can be  attached to the points.  The fisher waits for fish to appear, then plunges the spear into the water. This method is often used for lake sturgeon fishing.  In the United States many states allow only rough fish to be taken while spear fishing.

Becoming increasingly popular is the use of a flasher, similar to its summer cousin the fishfinder . This is a sonar system that provides depth information, as well as indicating the presence of fish or other objects. These flashers, unlike most typical fishfinders, display the movement of fish and other objects almost instantaneously. The bait being used can often be seen as a mark on the flasher, enabling the angler to position the bait right in front of the fish. Underwater cameras are also now available which allow the user to view the fish and observe their reaction to the lure presentation.

Clubbing is an old method seldom used today, mainly used on burbot, the fisher walks on clear ice in shallow water and sees a large fish through the ice and with a large club which they slam into the ice, the shockwave hits the fish and it is temporary paralyzed, which gives the fisher time to cut a hole in the ice to collect the fish.

Ice fishing on ice

Ice fishing methods have changed drastically over the past 20 years.  The name of the game is mobility for today's modern ice anglers.  The days of drilling hole, waiting and hoping that a fish will swim by, are starting to fade.  With light gear, battery-operated sonar units, and fast and powered augers, an angler can conceivably drill and check hundreds of holes in a single day.  When the fish stop biting where they are, anglers can move to the next hole, checking it with their sonar first to look for activity, and if there are no fish they will keep moving until fish are found.  In addition, schools of fish tend to move around; so a hole may be productive for 10 minutes and then slow down to nothing for an hour before a school returns to that location.  This "fish where the fish are" technique and ease of mobility increases the catch rate of any angler, because it minimizes the wait between bites, similar to "trolling" in the summer months.

Anglers can now use many available maps and surveys to help pinpoint lakes and areas within those lakes that make sense to try for specific fish, noting those locations in latitude and longitude coordinates. They are then able to use a handheld GPS receiver to aim them to those spots, usually with accuracy of less than 20 feet. Ice anglers then drill holes with whichever auger they have, checking the ice thickness for safety as they go. Most ice fishers advise checking that the ice is at least 4 inches thick. Using sonar, the angler can determine the depth of the water, bottom content, weed and structure cover, and even see if there are fish there. Also, by using sonar, they can place the bait according to where they think the fish are. If they are using "tip-ups" they can carpet the area at different depths and with different presentations (the number allowed being determined by local laws) and see what is the most productive.  Modern ice anglers can also use modern reels mounted on shorter (18"-36"/45–90 cm long) fishing rods to actively fish by watching, by using their sonar, where their lure is relative to the fish, and jig accordingly to entice a bite.

Ice fishing can be done at any time of day, and is typically most active around dusk and dawn.  Different fish are active at different times of day, so anglers need to fish for them accordingly. There are fish houses large enough and comfortable enough to spend many days in a row out on the lake, fishing the entire time. One can even fish in one's sleep, by using audible alarms on one's lines to tell when a fish is biting.  There are also many lightweight and highly mobile portable shelters that mount on plastic sleds and collapse for transportation. These can vary from small, one-person shelters (commonly called "Fish Traps") to large and complex shelters able to fit up to 20 people at once.

Dangers and Safety Precautions

Ice Thickness and Type 
There are many variables which dictate whether or not ice is safe to walk on, however there are some widely accepted parameters. For example, newly frozen ice is always safer than older ice. "Good ice" is ice which has frozen without the interruption of large temperature fluctuations, rain, or snow and is clear and free of large lumps and cracks. Additionally, the safest ice is that which sits upon a lake without moving water. Ice on the surface of rivers can be extremely unpredictable.
Many anglers will go out with as little as 2.5 inches (6.4 cm) of "good ice" for walking on. The recommended thickness of ice to support an average person is 4 inches (10 cm), 5-6 inches (13-15 cm) for sleds (snow machines, snowmobiles) and most ATVs, 7-12 inches (18–30 cm) for light cars, and large ATVs and a minimum of 14 inches (36-41 cm) for full-sized trucks. Thinner ice in areas with swift surface currents are a significant hazard, as is ice that is directly over underwater spring.

Hazards to Ice 

Offshore winds can break off pans of ice which are miles wide, stranding large numbers of fishers. Just such a circumstance occurred in Lake Erie in February 2009, with 100 fishers having to be rescued by helicopters, local authorities, and the Coast Guard. One man who had fallen into the water died on the rescue flight. On March 28, 2013, as many as 220 ice anglers were trapped on break-away sea ice floes in the Gulf of Riga (Latvia), necessitating a full-scale rescue operation which employed helicopters and hovercraft. Many similar operations—although typically much smaller in scale—are required each year due to reckless and/or inexperienced anglers.

Late-winter warm spells can destroy the texture of the ice, which, while still of the required thickness, will not adequately support weight. It is called "rotten ice" or soft ice and is exceedingly dangerous. Some ice anglers will continue to fish, since even with the bad ice normally 8 inches (20 cm) is more than enough. Ice anglers may carry a self-rescue device called an ″ice pick″ made of two spiked handles connected by a string to pull themselves out of the water and onto the ice.

Hazards to People 
Many cars, trucks, SUVs, snowmobiles, and fish houses fall through the ice each year.  Current environmental regulations require the speedy recovery of the vehicle or structure in this situation. Divers must be hired, and when the trouble occurs far from shore, helicopters may be employed for hoisting.

Other risks associated with ice fishing include carbon monoxide poisoning from fish house heaters and frostbite due to prolonged exposure to wind and low temperatures, although most new houses are fitted with air exchange systems that allow air flow, preventing poisoning.

Although fatalities are somewhat rare, in the year of 2017, 56 people died while out on the ice in USA and Canada. Fatalities almost always occur from drowning after one has fallen into the ice, although a small number of victims died from blunt-force trauma (e.g.: hitting one's head on the ice whilst falling in the water).

Contests

Anywhere there is fishing, there are contests, and ice fishing is no exception. Ice fishing contests generally offer prizes for the largest number of fish caught within a limited time period. There are many ice fishing contests consisting of friends and neighbors with a modest number of contestants and small prizes. Conversely, throughout North America—especially in the northern parts of the Midwest and throughout Canada—many large and well-organized contests take place yearly. Most of these larger contests offer big prizes for contestants who catch the biggest fish.

Currently, the world's largest contest, the Brainerd Jaycees Ice Fishing Extravaganza, is held on Gull Lake, north of Brainerd, Minnesota, in January of each year. The contest has over 15,000 anglers and drills over 20,000 holes for the contest. $152,232 in charity was raised in the 2016 contest, and donated to 41 local charities.

Lake Simcoe in Canada has abundant cold water fish such as lake trout, herring and whitefish. It is sometimes known as Canada's ice fishing capital, and every year it is host to a very large and well-organized contest.

In Hwacheon, South Korea, a large ice fishing festival is held every January. The Ice Festival draws nearly a million visitors every year, and thousands of people have taken part in a contest to catch fish in a frozen Hwacheoncheon (a tributary of the Han River).

See also
Fly fishing
Ice jigger
Kayak fishing
Surf fishing

References

External links

 
Fishing techniques and methods
fishing
Minnesota culture
Water ice